The 2007 IIHF Women's World Championships were held from April 3 to 10, 2007 in Winnipeg and Selkirk, Manitoba, Canada.  There were no championships in 2006 due to the Torino Olympic tournament.  Games were played at the MTS Centre and Selkirk Recreation Complex.

It was the tenth event, and it was run by the International Ice Hockey Federation (IIHF).  Canada, led by tournament MVP Hayley Wickenheiser, won its ninth world championship by defeating the USA 5–1 in the gold medal game.  Following Sweden's historic Silver in the Olympics they captured their second world championship Bronze, blanking rival Finland 1–0.  This championship stands as the only women's to have over one hundred thousand attendees.

In June 2006, the IIHF expanded Pool A from 8 to 9 teams, restoring Russia, which had been demoted to Division I after the 2005 event.  The decision was made due to the success of the 9-team pool in the 2004 Championships. Because of this change, all teams demoted after the 2005 event were restored to their 2005 divisions for 2007.  Three new countries entered the tournament for the first time in 2007.

Venues

Top Division

Preliminary round 
All times are local (UTC−5).

Group A

Group B

Group C

Qualifying round

Group D (1–3 Place)

Group E (4–6 Place)

Consolation round

Group F (7–9 Place) 

 will be demoted to Division I for the 2008 Women's World Ice Hockey Championships.

Final round

Bronze medal game

Final

Awards and Statistics

Scoring leaders

Goaltending leaders
(minimum 40% team's total ice time)

Directorate Awards
Goaltender:  Noora Räty
Defenceman:  Molly Engstrom
Forward:  Hayley Wickenheiser
Source: IIHF.com

Media All-Stars
Goaltender:  Kim St-Pierre
Defencemen:  Angela Ruggiero,  Delaney Collins
Forwards:  Krissy Wendell,  Hayley Wickenheiser,  Natalie Darwitz
Most Valuable Player:  Hayley Wickenheiser
Source: IIHF.com

Division I
The following teams took part in the Division I tournament, held from April 2, 2007 through April 8, 2007 in Nikkō, Japan:

Statistics

Scoring leaders

Goaltending leaders 
(minimum 40% team's total ice time)

Division II
The following teams took part in the Division II tournament, held from March 17, 2007 through March 23, 2007 in Pyongyang, North Korea.

Statistics

Scoring leaders

Goaltending leaders 
(minimum 40% team's total ice time)

Division III
The following teams took part in the Division III tournament, held from March 5, 2007 through March 10, 2007 in Sheffield, England:

Statistics

Scoring leaders

Goaltending leaders 
(minimum 40% team's total ice time)

Division IV
The following teams took part in the Division IV tournament, held from March 26, 2007 through April 1, 2007 in Miercurea-Ciuc, Romania:

 is promoted to Division III in the 2008 Women's World Ice Hockey Championships

Awards and Statistics

Scoring leaders

Goaltending leaders
(minimum 40% team's total ice time)

Directorate Awards
Goaltender: Beata Antal, 
Defenseman: Diana Kruseljposavec, 
Forward: Shiree Haslemore, 

Source: IIHF.com

See also
2007 in ice hockey

References

External links
IIHF Official Site
Complete results

IIHF results index for 2007

World
International ice hockey competitions hosted by Canada
World
IIHF Women's World Ice Hockey Championships
Sport in Selkirk, Manitoba
Women's World Championship 2007
April 2007 sports events in Canada
Women's ice hockey competitions in Canada
2007 in Manitoba
2000s in Winnipeg